Richard R. Gaillardetz (born 1958) is an American theologian specializing in questions relating to Catholic ecclesiology and the structures of authority in the Roman Catholic Church. For his dissertation he researched ‘the Theology of the Ordinary Universal Magisterium of Bishops’. He is the author or editor of thirteen books, the most recent of which is An Unfinished Council:  Vatican II, Pope Francis, and the Renewal of Catholicism (Liturgical Press, 2015).

Born in a Texas military family, he earned his BA in humanities in 1981 from the University of Texas and an MA in biblical theology at St. Mary's University in San Antonio, Texas in 1984.  He also received an MA and a PhD in systematic theology from the University of Notre Dame. From 1991 to 2001, he taught at the University of St. Thomas Graduate School of Theology in Houston, Texas. From 2001 to 2011, Gaillardetz held the Thomas and Margaret Murray and James J. Bacik Chair in Catholic Studies at the University of Toledo. He has served on the board of directors of the Catholic Theological Society of America and on the US Roman Catholic–Methodist Ecumenical Dialogue. In 2011, Gaillardetz left the University of Toledo to accept the Joseph Chair of Catholic Systematic Theology at Boston College.

Books
Go Into the Streets!  The Welcoming Church of Pope Francis
An Unfinished Council
A Church with Open Doors
The Church in the Making
Ecclesiology for a Global Church
A Daring Promise: A Spirituality of Christian Marriage
By What Authority?
Readings in Church Authority
Teaching with Authority
Transforming Our Days
Witnesses to the Faith
Keys to the Council
When the Magisterium Intervenes

References

1958 births
American theologians
Living people
St. Mary's University, Texas alumni
Presidents of the Catholic Theological Society of America